Cap cai, sometimes spelled cap cay, is the Hokkien-derived term for a popular Chinese Indonesian and Peranakan stir-fried vegetable dish that originates from Fujian cuisine.

Various vegetables such as cauliflower, cabbage, Chinese cabbage, Napa cabbage, carrot, baby corn, mushrooms, and leeks are chopped and stir-fried in a wok with small amount of cooking oil and water. Chopped garlic and onion with salt, sugar, soy sauce, ang ciu Chinese cooking wine and oyster sauce are added for flavour. The liquid sauces are thickened using corn starch. 

Cap cai can be made as a vegetarian dish, or mixed with meats such as chicken, liver or gizzard, beef, fish, shrimp or cuttlefish, and slices of beef or fish bakso (meatballs). The type and numbers of vegetables differ according to recipe variations and the availability of vegetables in each household, but the most common vegetables in simple cap cai are cauliflower, cabbage and carrot.

See also

 Chop suey
 Japchae
 Peranakan cuisine

References 

Indonesian Chinese cuisine
Vegetable dishes of Indonesia